Music:Response is an extended play by English electronic music duo the Chemical Brothers. The song "Music:Response" contains a sample of "Make It Hot" by Nicole Wray featuring Missy Elliott. "The Gentleman Thief" remix was made by Justin Robertson. This EP was not eligible for the UK charts because it had five songs instead of three songs, which is required for qualification. The American EP was met with critical response by Robert Christgau, who gave it a score of "neither". 

In France, "Music:Response" was released as a double A-side with "Asleep from Day". The song "Piku Playground" live was originally released in 1998 on the MTV compilation Amp 2. The song "Freak of the Week" was previously released in June 1998 as "Electronic Battle Weapon 4".

Critical reception

The EP received mixed reviews from music critics.

Track listing

References

2000 EPs
Astralwerks EPs
The Chemical Brothers EPs
Virgin Records EPs